The Anderssons in Greece is a Swedish children's comedy film which was released to cinemas in Sweden on 25 December 2012, and originally planned for 2011 and thought to be set in Cyprus and not Greece. The film is based on the book Sune i Grekland of the Sune book series and was recorded in Rhodos Sunwing Resort Kallithea and in Stockholm.

The film was seen by more than 500,000.

Premise
The Andersson's family go on a vacation to Greece, travelling there by aeroplane.

Actors
William Ringström - Sune
Morgan Alling - Rudolf
Anja Lundqvist - Karin
Julius Jimenez Hugoson - Håkan
Hanna Elffors Elfström - Anna
Julia Dufvenius - Sabina
Erik Johansson - Pontus
Feline Andersson - Hedda
Kajsa Halldén - Sophie
Madeleine Barwén Trollvik - Idol-Lisa
Anna-Maria Dahl - Linda
Gustav Levin - Ralf
Sofia Rönnegård - security guard
Ann-Charlotte Franzén tour guide
Manos Gavras - hotel boss
Vangelis Petras - Costas
Panagiotis Roditis - Yiannis
Georgios Nikolis - headwaiter
Jesper Jarnsäter - waiter

Production
Shooting began in late-May 2012 in Kallithea at Rhodos. The Sweden scenes were shot in Västerås.

Home video
The film was released to DVD and Blu-ray in 2013.

References

External links

2010s children's comedy films
Films based on works by Anders Jacobsson and Sören Olsson
Films directed by Hannes Holm
Films set in Greece
Films set in Sweden
Films shot in Greece
Films shot in Sweden
Swedish sequel films
Swedish comedy films
2010s Swedish-language films
Films about vacationing
2012 films
Greece–Sweden relations
2012 comedy films
2010s Swedish films